is a Japanese football player. He plays for Verspah Oita.

Club statistics
Updated to 20 February 2020.

References

External links

Profile at YSCC Yokohama

1998 births
Living people
Association football people from Kanagawa Prefecture
Japanese footballers
J3 League players
Japan Football League players
YSCC Yokohama players
Matsue City FC players
Verspah Oita players
Association football forwards